The Kids In Need Foundation is an American national 501(c)(3) charity that believes every child in America should have equal opportunity and access to a quality education. By partnering with teachers and students in under-resourced schools, Kids In Need Foundation provides the support needed for teachers to teach and learners to learn.

Second Responder® 
The Second Responder® program operates during the recovery period following the devastation, once the critical necessities of food, shelter, and medical aid are in place. KINF delivers hope in a tangible way for teachers and students to return to the important work of learning as they start the path to rebuilding.

School Ready Supplies 
Partnering with corporations and philanthropic organizations throughout the country to provide completely assembled school supply backpacks to students who otherwise would have to do without the basic tools for learning.

Supply A Teacher 
KINF’s Supply A Teacher program seeks to remove the burden of having to provide necessary resources from teachers in underserved schools. Every teacher supported through our program receives two boxes of items they need to fuel a full semester of active learning. Donors can fund a teacher, school, or entire school district they’d like to support.

National Network of Resource Centers (2020) 
KINF is proud to partner with 42 organizations across the country to help distribute much-needed school supplies to students who would otherwise go without.
 
These organizations focus on schools with high percentages of students enrolled in the federal free and reduced lunch program. With the generous support of our donors, sponsors, and national product partners, we supply them with the basic tools needed to learn and succeed in school.

A Gift For Teaching – Orlando, Fla.

Atlanta Kids In Need Resource Center/Empty Stocking Fund – Atlanta, Ga.

Back To School Teachers' Store – Muncie, Ind.

Classroom Central – Charlotte, N.C.

Cleveland Kids In Need Resource Center – Cleveland, Ohio

Crayons to Classrooms – Dayton, Ohio

Crayons to Computers – Cincinnati, Ohio

Equipped 2 Teach – Utica, N.Y.

Kids In Need Foundation Resource Center – Minneapolis, Minn.

KidSmart - Tools For Learning – St. Louis, Mo.

LP Pencil Box – Nashville, Tenn.

North Texas Teacher Resource Center – Dallas, Texas

Ocean Bank Center for Educational Materials – Miami, Fla.

Pencils and Paper – Rochester, N.Y.

Project Teacher – Wichita, Kan.

Red Apple Supplies – West Palm Beach, Fla.

Ruth's Reusable Resources – Portland, Maine

School Tools – A Project of the Food Bank RGV – McAllen, Texas

Schoolhouse Supplies – Portland, Ore.

Schools Tools Inland Empire United Way – Rancho Cucamonga, Calif.

Schools Tools- SE Texas Food Bank – Beaumont, Texas

Supply Zone for Teachers – Brevard County, Fla.

Teacher EXCHANGE® – Las Vegas, Nev.

Teacher Resource Center – Appalachia, W.V.

Teacher Resource Center – Bronx, N.Y.

Teacher Resource Center – Fife, Wash.

Teacher Resource Center Chicago – Chicago, Ill.

Teacher Resource Center Hartford – Hartford, Conn.

Teacher Resource Center of the North Bay – Napa, Calif.

Teachers Aid – Houston Food Bank – Houston, Texas

Teacher's Harvest – Valdosta, Ga. 

Teachers' Supply Closet – Charleston, S.C.

Teachers' Treasures – Indianapolis, Ind.

Teaching Tools Resource Center – Tampa, Fla.

The CORE Store - Plano, Texas

The Education Partnership – Pittsburgh, Pa

The Pencil Box – Tulsa, Okla.

The Teacher's Desk – Buffalo, N.Y.

Tools 4 Teaching – Ocala, Fla.

Tools for Schools Broward – Fort Lauderdale, Fla.

Tools for Schools St. Lucie – Fort Pierce, Fla.

Treasures 4 Teachers  – Phoenix, Ariz.

References 

Kids In Need Foundation

External links
Official website

Educational foundations in the United States
Charities based in Minnesota
Youth organizations based in Minnesota